Freeboard may refer to:

 Freeboard (nautical), the height of a ship's deck above the water level
 Freeboard (skateboard), a six-wheeled skateboard designed to act like a snowboard on pavement
 Sea ice freeboard, the height of an ice floe above the water surface, used in measuring sea ice thickness